Scott Jiu Wo Kawasaki (born March 20, 1975) is an American healthcare professional and politician from Alaska. A Democrat, he is a member of the Alaska Senate representing the state's District A, which includes neighborhoods within the city limits of Fairbanks.

Early life and education
Scott Kawasaki was born in Tokyo, Japan while his parents Koji and Virginia Kawasaki taught internationally. The family returned to Fairbanks in 1980, where he has lived ever since. Kawasaki attended public schools in Fairbanks before earning a Bachelor of Science in Biomedical Sciences from the University of Alaska Fairbanks in 2006.

Career
Kawasaki was elected to the Fairbanks City Council in 1999. At age 24, he was one of the youngest members ever to serve on that body. He served on the Fairbanks City Council for two consecutive terms from 1999 till 2005.

Kawasaki was elected state representative for House District 9, in 2006, defeating Republican incumbent Jim Holm by 2617 votes (55 percent) to 2118 (45 percent). He had previously run in 2004, losing to Holm by 52 votes.

Kawasaki was reelected in 2008 defeating Republican challenger Sue Hull. He was the youngest member of the legislature at that time. Kawasaki defeated Republican nominee Joseph Michel in the 2010 election. In 2012, in District 4, he narrowly beat David Pruhs, with 51-47% of the vote.

In 2014, he beat Gregory Bringhurst with 55% of the tally, and was unopposed in 2016. Prior to the appointment of Sam Kito III in 2014, Kawasaki was the only Asian American currently serving in the Alaska Legislature.

Kawasaki ran against incumbent Senator Pete Kelly in 2018, winning with 50.79% of the vote. The Fairbanks-North Star Borough Assembly's Presiding Officer Kathryn Dodge filed to run as a Democrat for the House seat Kawasaki had held. She lost by one vote.

References

External links

 
 Alaska State Legislature – Representative Scott Kawasaki official government website
 Project Vote Smart – Representative Scott J. Kawasaki (AK) profile
 Follow the Money – Scott Kawasaki
 2006 2004 campaign contributions
 Alaska's Democratic Caucus – Scott Kawasaki profile
 Scott Kawasaki at 100 Years of Alaska's Legislature

1975 births
20th-century American politicians
21st-century American politicians
Alaska city council members
Asian-American city council members
Democratic Party Alaska state senators
American politicians of Japanese descent
Asian-American people in Alaska politics
Living people
Democratic Party members of the Alaska House of Representatives
Politicians from Fairbanks, Alaska
Politicians from Tokyo
University of Alaska Fairbanks alumni